Bahrain participated at the 2018 Summer Youth Olympics in Buenos Aires, Argentina from 6 October to 18 October 2018.

Athletics

Track and road events

Tennis

Singles

Doubles

Weightlifting

Bahrain was given a quota by the tripartite committee to compete in weightlifting.

References

2018 in Bahraini sport
Nations at the 2018 Summer Youth Olympics
Bahrain at the Youth Olympics